Daniel Gran (22 May 1694 in Vienna – 16 April 1757 in Sankt Pölten), was an Austrian painter. His pictures ornament several public buildings in his native city. He was of some consideration in his time and after a century of Italian dominance one of the first important painters of the German-speaking countries, but his works are relatively unknown outside of Austria and Germany today.

Life and education
Gran was one of the sons of Hofkochs Kaiser Leopold I. He was sponsored by the House of Schwarzenberg, which helped finance his studies and travels in Italy, where he studied primarily with Sebastiano Ricci in Venice and Francesco Solimena in Naples. His works can be noted for a wavering between Venetian influence in coloring and Neapolitan influence in composition. In addition to the Princely House of Schwarzenberg, he also painted for the House of Habsburg; 1727 he was appointed court painter.

From 1732, he used the title "Daniel le Grand," and from 1736, with the predicate "della Torre." In the absence of documentation, the verifiability of his nobility in the Registry of Vienna Gratialarchivs is doubtful. More accurate is the master title and coat of arms of an imperial Fähnrich, Nikolaus Gran della Torre (ennobled on 12 May 1621) which successfully laid his claim and revived his title. A wrongful use of noble titles and predicates would have been unthinkable in the time and exposed the social position of the artist.

Towards the end of his career, his paintings appear increasingly less "Baroque" (in figural dimensions, illusionism). Gran therefore can be seen as an important precursor of classicism.

In 1894, in Vienna's Rudolfsheim-Fünfhaus (15th District), the Grangasse street was named after him.

Works 
Frescoes
 Palais Schwarzenberg (Vienna)
 Prunksaal of the Österreichische Nationalbibliothek (formerly Hofbibliothek) (Vienna)
 Eckartsau castle
 Pilgrimage church Sonntagberg
 cathedral in Sankt Pölten
 Kaisersaal in Stift Klosterneuburg
 Neues Rathaus and Landhaussaal in Brno
Altar paintings
 Churches in the Stift Herzogenburg and Stift Lilienfeld
 Parish Church of Hirschstetten
 Cathedral in Sankt Pölten
 St Anna's church (Vienna)

Self-portrait in the monastery of Herzogenburg.

Gallery

Notes

References

Further reading
 
 
 Eckhard Knab: Daniel Gran. Herold, Wien/München 1977, .
 Johann Kronbichler: GRANDEZZA - Der Barockmaler Daniel Gran 1694-1757. St. Pölten 2007, .

External links
 
 
 Werke von Daniel Gran in: Digitales Belvedere

Baroque painters
18th-century Austrian painters
18th-century Austrian male artists
Austrian male painters
Artists from Vienna
1694 births
1757 deaths